Together Together is a 2021 American comedy film written and directed by Nikole Beckwith. The film stars Ed Helms and Patti Harrison. The film had its world premiere at the Sundance Film Festival on January 31, 2021, and was released on April 23, 2021, by Bleecker Street.

Plot 

Matt, a 40+ y.o. app developer, interviews Anna, a 20+ y.o. who works at a coffee shop, to become his surrogate. He wants to become a dad without getting married and she wants to finance her bachelor's and master's degrees. 

During her first trimester, the doctor tells Matt and Anna that everything is going well, so he invites Anna to dinner to celebrate. Afterwards, Matt tells his brother and parents about the pregnancy; his mother is unhappy about it. 

At dinner, Matt and Anna talk about how nervous they are about conversing with each other. While ordering, he makes a disapproving sound when she orders potato over salad, as what she eats the baby eats. He orders pasta with bacon. Once the waitress leaves, Anna points out that he should also watch his diet for the child, as in his case it matters for the next 18+ years.

Next, they attend therapy together, where Matt expresses excitement and wants to tell everybody, and is surprised that Anna is not going to tell anyone about the pregnancy. Coming out of therapy, Matt asks if she wants a bite of candy, as when he went to couple's therapy with his ex, afterwards they would hold hands and eat candy.

At the coffee shop, Matt brings pregnancy tea and clogs for Anna. She takes the tea, but not the clogs. Matt takes them to Anna's house, where he meets a guy Anna hooked up with. He gets upset as he thinks it's bad for the baby. At the hospital, Anna insists he cannot stop her from having sex for a whole year, and it is safe for pregnant women have sex, which the technician confirms. They then happily listen to the heartbeat. 

At therapy, Matt says that it was very exciting and he wants to hear that sound all the time, while Anna says that it was nice to see Matt so happy. The therapist asks them if they are having any conflicts other than the clogs, and they talk about Matt's concern over Anna having sex. Although the therapist tries to clear his doubts, he remains skeptical. 

During the second trimester, Anna tells Matt that she needs the money to get into an accelerated degree program to complete her bachelor's and master's degrees in three years. Matt shows her the future nursery, and she helps him pick the color for it. Next, both have a deep conversation about why they are alone. 

They start hanging out more and choose a gender-neutral name to refer to the baby, "Lamp". At the mall, seeking maternity wear, Anna meets her sister's friend and lies that she works there. She doesn't want her sister or parents to know she is pregnant, as they would disapprove.

Matt asks Anna to move in with him until the birth, as he wants to get all the possible time with the baby. As they go crib shopping, the salesgirl calls them a couple, but Anna says, "Ew, no". This upsets Matt a little. Anna explains it would be gross if they were a couple, as he is twenty years older. 

At the baby shower, Anna feels odd when Matt's mother says she's unrelated to the baby. Anna realizes that despite trying so hard not to, she is getting attached to the baby and Matt. She leaves his house afterwards, citing the importance of boundaries. 

In the third trimester, Anna and Matt attend a prenatal class to prepare mothers for childbirth. After some days, Anna feels mild cramps at night and calls Matt, fearing early labor. The doctor says such cramps are normal and the baby is healthy, but not coming yet. After the visit, Anna confesses that she loves Matt in a platonic way and she doesn't want to lose him, but that she can't stay, as she got accepted to a Vermont college. Matt says they won't lose each other, as he loves her too and that he is proud of her for getting into college. 

This time, after attending therapy, Anna asks if Matt wants to hold hands and eat candy, which they do in the park on a bench. She starts having contractions one week before the due date. They do all the things they learned at the birth center and take Anna to the hospital, where she delivers baby Lamp. The movie ends with Matt consoling a crying Lamp.

Cast

Release
The film had its world premiere in the U.S. Dramatic Competition section of the Sundance Film Festival on January 31, 2021. Prior to this, Bleecker Street acquired the US distribution rights, while Sony Pictures Worldwide Acquisitions acquired the international distribution rights. It had a limited release on April 23, 2021, followed by video on demand on May 11, 2021.

Reception

Critical response

Box office 
With a limited release during the COVID-19 pandemic, Together Together grossed $1.4 million at the box office in the United States and Canada,.

References

External links

2021 comedy films
American comedy films
2021 independent films
American pregnancy films
Films set in San Francisco
Films shot in San Francisco
2020s English-language films
2020s American films
Films scored by Alex Somers